The second season of the Romanian reality talent show Vocea României Junior premiered on June 8, 2018 on Pro TV with Andra, Inna and Marius Moga as coaches.

Coaches and presenters

Hosts
The hosts remained the same as in the previous season: Mihai Bobonete and Robert Tudor.

Coaches
The coaches remained the same as in the previous season: Andra, Marius Moga, Inna.

Selection process

Pre-selections took place in the following cities:

Teams
Colour key:
  Winner
  Finalist
  Eliminated in the Semi-final
  Eliminated in the Battles

Blind Auditions
Colour key

Episode 1 (June 8)
The first episode of The Blind Auditions aired on June 8, 2018.

Episode 2 (June 15)
The second episode of The Blind Auditions aired on June 15, 2018.

Episode 3 (June 22)
The third episode of The Blind Auditions aired on June 22, 2018.

Episode 4 (June 29)
The fourth episode of The Blind Auditions aired on June 29, 2018.

Battles (July 6)
After the Blind auditions, each coach had 9 contestants for the Battles, which was broadcast on July 6, 2018. The coaches reduced their teams to one-third. Contestants who won their battles would advance to the Semifinals.

Colour key

Semi-final (July 13)
The semifinal was broadcast on July 13, 2018. The 9 remaining contestants in the three teams performed. From each team, the coach's choice artist would be qualified for the grand finals.

Final (July 20)
The final was broadcast on July 20, 2018. Each contestant performed three songs: one solo, one duet with their coaches, and one duet with a guest artist.

Results per artist
Team's colour key
 Team Andra
 Team Moga
 Team Inna
Result's colour key
 Artist received the most public votes
 Artist was eliminated 
 Finalist

References

Romania
2018 Romanian television seasons